The Big Badja River, a perennial river of the Murrumbidgee catchment within the Murray–Darling basin, is located in the Monaro region of New South Wales, Australia.

Alluvial gold was discovered in and along the river in 1858, with the Big Badja diggings worked between 1861 and 1868.

See also
 List of rivers of Australia

References

Rivers of New South Wales
Tributaries of the Murrumbidgee River